Deep Sea 3D is a 3D IMAX documentary film about sea life. The documentary is directed by Howard Hall who has also directed other undersea films such as Into the Deep and Island of the Sharks. The film is narrated by Johnny Depp and Kate Winslet. It also features music by Danny Elfman. The film is 40 minutes long.

The film shows various sea animals, such as jellyfish, octopuses, and turtles as well as coral reef life.

IMAX 3D Cinema list
IMAX 3D Cinema (27 January 2007)

External links
 IMAX Deep Sea 3D

References list

2006 films
2006 short documentary films
Warner Bros. films
American short documentary films
2006 3D films
Documentary films about marine biology
IMAX short films
American 3D films
3D short films
Films scored by Danny Elfman
Films scored by Deborah Lurie
IMAX documentary films
3D documentary films
2000s English-language films
2000s American films